Antonine is a Swedish, Danish, and Norwegian feminine given name that is a form of Antonina and a diminutive form of Antonia that is used in Norway, Denmark, Sweden and Greenland. It is also a masculine name. Notable people with this name include the following individuals:

Female
Antonine Maillet (born 1929), Canadian writer
Antonine Meunier (1877 – 1972), French ballerina

Male
Antonine Barada (1807 – 1885), American folk hero
Antonine Tibesar (1909 – 1992), American Franciscan friar

See also

Antonie (given name)
Antonin (name)
Antonina (name)
Antonini (name)
Antonino (name)
Antoniny (disambiguation)

Notes

Danish feminine given names
Norwegian feminine given names
Swedish feminine given names